East Canada Creek is a  river in upstate New York, United States. It is a tributary of the Mohawk River and flows southward from New York's Adirondack Park. The name "Canada" may be derived from the St. Lawrence Iroquoian word Kanata, meaning "village"; the name may also refer to the creek's importance as a trail to Canada in colonial times.

Course
The creek is formed northeast of Powley Place in the Town of Arietta in Hamilton County, where it is created by the confluence of smaller streams. It goes on to form part of the boundary between Herkimer, Fulton, and Montgomery counties. It also flows through the Village of Dolgeville, after passing Dolgeville it enters into Kyser Lake.

Hydrology
It has been in service from December 1945 to March 1995, 1998, 2000, 2003-2014, and July 2014 to current year.

See also 
 West Canada Creek
 List of rivers in New York

References

Adirondacks
Rivers of New York (state)
Tributaries of the Hudson River
Rivers of Herkimer County, New York
Rivers of Fulton County, New York
Rivers of Montgomery County, New York